Erickson Fernández (born January 31, 1988), known by the stage name Mozart La Para, is a Dominican rapper and singer who has had songs in the charts five times.

Early life
Fernández was born in Los Mina, Santo Domingo, Dominican Republic.

Career
In 2016, he signed to Roc Nation, becoming the first artist to be signed to that label's Latin division. Prior to signing with Roc Nation, Fernández had been a musician for 15 years, releasing numerous hits that made it to Billboard's Tropical Songs chart. He was also the subject of Pueto Pa' Mi, a 2015 film based on his life.

Discography

Singles

As featured performer

 Toy Enamorao (2015) charted at #1 on Tropical Songs
 Mujeres (2018) -- Peaked at #3 on Productores de Música de España chart.

Personal life
Fernández was married to Romanian-Italian real estate businesswoman Alexandra Hatcu, and together they have a daughter, Charlotte (born 2013).

The couple announced on March 26, 2019, after 10 years of marriage, that they were divorcing.

References

External links
 
 

People from Santo Domingo
Dominican Republic rappers
21st-century Dominican Republic male singers
Dominican Republic songwriters
1988 births
Living people
Roc Nation artists